Baksa may refer to:

Places 
 Baisha, Taishan, Guangdong Province, China
 Baksa district, Assam, India
 Baksa, Nepal
 Baksa, Hungary
 Bocșa, Sălaj, in Sălaj County, Transylvania, Romania
 Kokšov-Bakša, a village and municipality in Košice-okolie District, Kosice Region, Slovakia
 Baksa, Syria, a village in northwestern Syria near Latakia
 Baksa, Hooghly, a census town, in West Bengal, India

People 
 Baksa (name), a given name
 Shannon Baksa or Shannon McRandle (born 1969), American model and makeup artist
 Zoltán Baksa (born 1983), Hungarian football player